Kevan Barry Brown (born 2 January 1966) is an English retired professional footballer who played at full back in the Football League for Brighton & Hove Albion and Aldershot in the 1980s and 1990s, before a career in non-league football.

Football career
Brown was born in Andover, Hampshire, the son of Peter Brown, the former Southampton forward, and his wife, June.

Brown joined Southampton as a trainee in 1982 after signing Associate School Boy Forms in 1979. He then signed as a professional in July 1984. He remained at The Dell until the spring of 1987, without breaking into the first team, although he made over 120 appearances for the reserves. In February 1987, he went on loan to Brighton and Hove Albion, with the deal being made permanent the following month with Brighton and Hibe Albion paying £10000 for his signature.

After a two seasons at Brighton and helping them to promotion back to the then 2nd Division in November 1988 he transferred to Aldershot, where he was to remain for four seasons, making 175 senior appearances. Described as "a talented right back", Brown made his debut for Aldershot in a 1–0 victory over Sheffield United

Brown then joined Woking in the Football Conference whom he helped win the FA Trophy in 1994 and 1995. In 1996–97, he formed a defensive partnership with Steve Foster which was described as "impeccable". In February 1997, Woking played Coventry City in the FA Cup with the first match at Highfield Road being drawn 1–1. In the replay at the Kingfield Stadium, an own goal by Steve Foster handed the match to Coventry. On 16 May 1997, Woking won the FA Trophy defeating Dagenham & Redbridge 1–0 in extra time.

Brown left Woking in March 1998, having achieved much success winning and captaining the team to three FA Trophy wins at Wembley, finishing runner-up twice in the Confetence and playing for England 5 times before joining Yeovil Town with Steve Thompson for a fee of £7,500. In August 1998, Woking arranged a testimonial match for Brown against  West Ham United. Brown remained at Huish Park until March 2000 when he was released by new manager David Webb. He returned to Woking, to help the club avoid relegation from the Football Conference.

Later career
In 2007, Brown was appointed Director of Sport at St. Francis School in Pewsey, Wiltshire.

Honours
Woking
FA Trophy winners: 1994, 1995, 1997

References

External links

Interview with Kevan Brown, 9 January 2000

1966 births
Living people
People from Andover, Hampshire
English footballers
Association football defenders
Southampton F.C. players
Brighton & Hove Albion F.C. players
Aldershot F.C. players
Woking F.C. players
Yeovil Town F.C. players
English Football League players
National League (English football) players
England semi-pro international footballers